The 2015–16 Montana Grizzlies basketball team represented the University of Montana during the 2015–16 NCAA Division I men's basketball season. The Grizzlies, led by second year head coach Travis DeCuire, played their home games at Dahlberg Arena and were members of the Big Sky Conference. They finished the season 21–12, 14–4 in Big Sky play to finish in second place. They defeated Sacramento State and Idaho to advance to the championship game of the Big Sky tournament where they lost to Weber State. They were invited to the College Basketball Invitational where they lost in the first round to Nevada.

Previous season
The Grizzlies finished the season 20–13, 14–4 in Big Sky play to finish in a share for the Big Sky regular season championship. They advanced to the championship game of the Big Sky tournament where they lost to Eastern Washington. As a regular season conference champions and #1 overall seed in their conference tournament, they received an automatic bid to the National Invitation Tournament where they lost in the first round to Texas A&M.

Departures

Incoming transfers

2015 incoming recruits

2016 incoming recruits

Roster

Schedule
Montana's nonconference schedule includes true road games at Kansas, Gonzaga, and North Dakota State. The Grizzlies will also play at Washington and host Boise State.

|-
!colspan=9 style="background:#660033; color:#848482;"| Exhibition

|-
!colspan=9 style="background:#660033; color:#848482;"| Non-conference regular season

|-
!colspan=9 style="background:#660033; color:#848482;"| Big Sky regular season

|-
!colspan=9 style="background:#660033; color:#848482;"| Big Sky tournament

|-
!colspan=9 style="background:#660033; color:#848482;"| CBI

See also
 2015–16 Montana Lady Griz basketball team

References

Montana Grizzlies basketball seasons
Montana
Montana Grizzlies basketball
Montana Grizzlies basketball
Montana